De La Salle College, also referred to as De La Salle Revesby, is an independent Roman Catholic comprehensive single-sex secondary day school for boys, located in Revesby Heights, in the south-western suburb of Sydney, New South Wales, Australia. De La Salle caters for approximately 620 students from Year 7 to Year 12.

History
The school was founded in 1960 by the De La Salle brothers.  The senior secondary school for students in Year 11 and Year 12 began in 2006, with their first HSC class in 2007.

HSC results are gradually improving, with numerous students being listed on various merit listings. In 2017, DLS Revesby was ranked 115th. De La Salle is also well known for the sporting accomplishments. They win a fair proportion of events in the Christian Brothers Sporting Association (CBSA) competitions. Revesby's Year 9 and 10 Netball was announced in 2018, for the second year in a row, as the best boys team for their age group in NSW. Additionally, their CBSA futsal team were crowned champions in 2018. Achievements also include wins in the statewide 2011 Berg Shield for cricket and the 2011 NSW Teams Championships for Schools for golf.

Notable alumni 
 Jacob Host, rugby league football player for St. George Illawarra Dragons
 Daryl Melham MP, Federal Member for Banks (1990-2013)
 Glen Hughes, Rugby League Football player for Canterbury-Bankstown
 Steven Hughes, Rugby League Football player for Canterbury-Bankstown 
 Corey Hughes, Rugby League Football Player for Canterbury-Bankstown, Cronulla-Sutherland and City Origin
 Dr Brian Owler, Former President of the Australian Medical Association

See also

 List of Catholic schools in New South Wales
 Catholic education in Australia
 Lasallian educational institutions

References

Boys' schools in New South Wales
Educational institutions established in 1960
1960 establishments in Australia
Revesby Heights
Revesby Heights